The KHL's Chernyshev Division was formed in 2008 as part of the league's inauguration. It is one of 4 divisions and part of the Eastern conference since the second season of KHL when the conferences were established. It is named in honor of Arkady Chernyshev; Soviet Master of Sports, IIHF Hall of Fame inductee and former Dynamo Moscow head coach.

Division lineup
The Chernyshev Division is made up of the following teams:
  Amur Khabarovsk
  Avangard Omsk
  Barys Nur-Sultan
  Kunlun Red Star Beijing
  Salavat Yulaev Ufa
  Sibir Novosibirsk

Lineup history

Initial lineup (2008)
In the first KHL season, the division alignment was determined by team strength and the Chernyshev Division consisted of:
Ak Bars Kazan, Barys Astana, Dynamo Moscow, Neftekhimik Nizhnekamsk, Torpedo Nizhny Novgorod and Vityaz Chekhov.

Re-alignment in 2009
With the geographical alignment of the divisions for the 2009–10 season, the composition of the Chernyshev division was completely changed. Only Barys Astana remained and was joined by Avangard Omsk, Salavat Yulaev Ufa, Sibir Novosibirsk, Amur Khabarovsk and Metallurg Novokuznetsk. It thus became the division with the most easterly located teams.

2013 Expansion
Newcomer Admiral Vladivostok, who joined the KHL in the 2013–14 season, was added to the Chernyshev Division.

2016 Far East Expansion
Newcomer Kunlun Red Star Beijing from China, who joined the KHL as an expansion team in the 2016–17 season, was added to the Chernyshev Division.

Division Champions
 2020:  Barys Nur-Sultan (84 points)
 2019:  Barys Nur-Sultan (86 points)
 2018:  Salavat Yulaev Ufa (93 points)
 2017:  Avangard Omsk (109 points)
 2016:  Avangard Omsk (106 points)
 2015:  Sibir Novosibirsk (111 points)
 2014:  Barys Astana (94 points)
 2013:  Avangard Omsk (102 points)
 2012:  Avangard Omsk (93 points)
 2011:  Avangard Omsk (118 points – Continental Cup winner)
 2010:  Salavat Yulaev Ufa (129 points – Continental Cup winner)
 2009:  Ak Bars Kazan (122 points)

Gagarin Cup winners produced
2021:  Avangard Omsk
2011:  Salavat Yulaev Ufa
2009:  Ak Bars Kazan

References

Kontinental Hockey League divisions